Marijan Ćavar (born 2 February 1998) is a Bosnian professional footballer who plays as a midfielder for Bosnian Premier League club Široki Brijeg.

Ćavar started his professional career at Zrinjski Mostar, before joining Eintracht Frankfurt in 2018, who loaned him to Osijek later that year.

A former youth international for Bosnia and Herzegovina, Ćavar made his senior international debut in 2018.

Club career

Early career
Ćavar started his career at local clubs, before joining Zrinjski Mostar's youth academy in 2014. He made his professional debut against Sloboda Tuzla on 28 May 2017 at the age of 19.

Eintracht Frankfurt
On 19 January 2018, Ćavar was transferred to German side Eintracht Frankfurt for an undisclosed fee. He waited on his official debut for the club over three months, until 28 April. Ćavar won his first trophy with the club on 19 May, by beating Bayern Munich in DFB-Pokal final.

In August 2018, Ćavar was sent on a season-long loan to Croatian club Osijek.

Ćavar joined SpVgg Greuther Fürth on a free transfer from Eintracht Frankfurt in January 2021 following a trial at the club. He signed a contract until the end of the season with the option of two further years.

International career
Ćavar represented Bosnia and Herzegovina on various youth levels. He also served as captain of the under-21 team under coach Vinko Marinović.

In January 2018, he received his first senior call-up, for friendly games against United States and Mexico. Ćavar debuted in a goalless draw against former on 28 January.

Career statistics

Club

International

Honours
Zrinjski Mostar
Bosnian Premier League: 2016–17

Eintracht Frankfurt
DFB-Pokal: 2017–18

References

External links

1998 births
Living people
People from Prozor-Rama
Croats of Bosnia and Herzegovina
Association football midfielders
Bosnia and Herzegovina footballers
Bosnia and Herzegovina youth international footballers
Bosnia and Herzegovina under-21 international footballers
Bosnia and Herzegovina international footballers
HŠK Zrinjski Mostar players
Eintracht Frankfurt players
NK Osijek players
SpVgg Greuther Fürth players
NK Široki Brijeg players
Premier League of Bosnia and Herzegovina players
Bundesliga players
Croatian Football League players
Bosnia and Herzegovina expatriate footballers
Expatriate footballers in Germany
Bosnia and Herzegovina expatriate sportspeople in Germany
Expatriate footballers in Croatia
Bosnia and Herzegovina expatriate sportspeople in Croatia